Achievement motivation inventory (AMI) (Schuler, Heinz; Thornton, George C. III; Frintrup, Andreas & Mueller-Hanson, Rose; 2002) is a psychological test to assess a broad construct of job-related achievement motivation. It is used within personnel selection, promotion, I/O-psychological research, personality research and other applications in a work context.

17 dimensions
AMI is assessing 17 dimensions of work related achievement motivation. These dimensions are:
 Compensatory effort: A willingness to expend extra effort in order to avoid failing at a work task, even if this effort results in over-preparation. A constructive reaction to the possibility of failure. Individuals who score high on this scale will compensate for a fear of failing at a difficult task by better preparing for the task. In the workplace, these individuals can be expected to be better prepared (or even over-prepared) than others. Especially relevant in case of low Fearlessness.
 Competitiveness:Motivation derived from competing with others. A desire to win and be better and faster than others. People who score high on this dimension love to compete with others and compare their accomplishments to others'. Winning motivates these individuals to expend even more effort.
 Confidence in success: Confidence in achieving success even when there are obstacles to overcome. People who score high on this dimension anticipate that their efforts will lead to success. These individuals are confident in achieving their goals even when facing new and difficult tasks. Their confidence stems from a faith in their knowledge, skills, and abilities as opposed to a belief in luck or fate.
 Dominance: The tendency to exercise power and influence over others. People who score high on this dimension are likely to take initiative and to seek control over activities. They would likely play a dominant role in influencing the results of a team and in taking a leadership role.
 Eagerness to learn: The desire and willingness to spend a lot of time enlarging one's knowledge for knowledge sake. People who score high on this dimension have a thirst for knowledge and will strive to learn new things, even in the absence of any external rewards.
 Engagement: The desire to be regularly engaged in an activity, usually work related. People who are highly engaged place a high priority on work and are uncomfortable when they have nothing to do. They are able to maintain a high activity level for a long period, with little rest. In the extreme, people high on this dimension may be “workaholics,” neglecting aspects of their personal life.
 Fearlessness: A lack of fear of failing at difficult tasks. People who score high on this dimension are not nervous about performing in public or under time-pressure. They do not fear being judged by others and do not become overly anxious when faced with important tasks. These individuals could be characterized as emotionally stable–minor setbacks will not have lasting effects.
 Flexibility: A willingness to accept changes and the enjoyment of challenging new tasks. People who score high on this dimension tend to be open-minded and interested in many things. They can easily adapt to new work situations and exhibit a readiness for change. New situations and things are appealing, especially if these experiences are likely to increase their knowledge.
 Flow: The ability to concentrate on something for a long time without being distracted by situational influences. People who score high on this dimension tend to become lost to the outside world when they are absorbed in a task. They are extremely persevering and in the extreme can be over-preoccupied.
 Goal setting: The tendency to set goals and to make long-term plans for achieving these goals. People who score high on this dimension are future-oriented and have high standards for what they want to achieve.
 Independence: The tendency to take responsibility for one's own actions. People who score high on this dimension would rather make their own decisions and work at their own pace than take direction from others.
 Internality: The belief that one's successes are due to internal causes rather than to situational variables. People who score high on this dimension are likely to attribute the consequences of their behaviors to internal causes. They believe that outcomes are the direct result of one's own actions and effort.
 Persistence: The willingness to exert large amounts of effort over long periods in order to reach a goal. Individuals who score high on this dimension are able to concentrate fully on the task at hand without being distracted. These individuals could be described as tenacious or energetic in striving to complete a task.
 Preference for difficult tasks: The tendency to seek out challenging rather than easy tasks, and the desire to seek greater challenges once one has already completed a difficult task. People who score high on this dimension prefer to take on difficult tasks with a high risk of failure to easy tasks with a low risk of failure.
 Pride in productivity: A sense of enjoyment and accomplishment derived from doing one's best at work. People who score high on this dimension are most satisfied when they feel they have improved their performance. Their self-esteem is dependent upon achievement and they gain positive emotions arising from good performance.
 Self-control: The ability to delay gratification and to organize oneself and one's work. People who score high on this dimension are able to make long term-plans. They do not procrastinate and concentrate on their work with a great deal of self-discipline.
 Status orientation: The desire to attain high status in one's personal life and to progress professionally. People who score high on this dimension endeavor to achieve an important position in life and to be admired for their achievements. They are especially motivated to pursue an important career and to progress in their jobs.

Test format
There are 170 Items on a 7-point-Likert-Scale. A short version will not cover all 17 dimensions but only contains 30 Items that best represent the total score. The 170-Item version takes appx. 30 Minutes to work on for the candidate and appx. 5-7 Minutes scoring for the Supervisor. The test can be administrated in single and in group sessions and is available as a paper-pencil test and in a web-based format with automated scoring.

Psychometrics

Reliability
Reliability (Cronbach's α) for the total score is α = .96, and ranges from α = .66 to α = .83 for individual scales. Retest reliability is rtt = .94 for the total score (rtt = .71 to rtt = .89 for single scales).

Content validity
Content validity has been demonstrated by extensive research on all major aspects of achievement motivation. Expert ratings ensured that only relevant aspects are included. Additionally, confirmatory factor analysis shows a good fit of the model to theory.

Construct validity
Construct validity is shown by correlations with related personality scales, e.g., Big Five inventories (ranging up to r = .72). Criterion related validity is indicated by prediction of grade point averages in US colleges (r = .22 for the total score and up to r = .29 for single scales) and early academic achievements (ranging between r = .21 to r = .36 on different scales).

Social validity and acceptance
Studies have shown that there is high social validity in regard to acceptance of the test by examinees.

Norms
Reported in the Manual (2002): N = 335 US students; N = 410 US working adults; N = 1,267 German students; N = 166 German working adults. Additional norms for the German original are also available.

Additional applications in Czech Republic and the US (Lanik, M., Thornton, G. C. III. & Hoskovcova, S. 2009) report extend norm bases for the US and Czech Republic. Meaningful score differences between subgroups of students and workers in the Manual's US Sample are reported by S. E. Woo, et al. A Norm of N=362 undergraduate students from Indonesia has been reported by Siaputra, I. B. (2013).

Critics
Whilst the broad construct of the Achievement Motivation Inventory contains 17 "independent" subscales with each ten (10) items, exploratory and confirmatory factor analysis only reside in three factors (self-assurance, ambition and self-control). Hence, for practical applications a more narrow construct definition with a limited number of items and shorter duration in test-taking might be favorable.

References

Further reading
 Schuler, H., Thornton, G.C.III., Frintrup, A., Mueller-Hanson, R. (2002). Achievement Motivation Inventory (AMI). Göttingen, Bern, New York: Hans Huber Publishers
 Byrne, Z. S., Mueller-Hanson, R. A., Cardador, J. M., Thornton, G. C.III., Schuler, H., Frintrup, A., Fox, S. (2004). Measuring Achievement Motivation: Tests of Equivalency for English, German and Israeli Versions of the Achievement Motivation Inventory. In: Personality and Individual Differences, 37, 203–217
 Lanik, M., Thornton, G. C. III. & Hoskovcova, S. (2009). A flat world? A comparative study of achievement motivation in the Czech Republic and the United States. In: Studia psychologica.
 Siaputra, I. B. (2013). The 4PA of plagiarism: A psycho-academic profile of plagiarists. In: International Journal for Educational Integrity Vol. 9 No. 2 December 2013 pp. 50–59.

External links
 Online manual and publishing information

Organizational behavior